Rathbones Bakeries was a bakery founded in 1893, in Wigan, Lancashire. By 1997 it was owned by Greencore, through that company's purchase of Kears Group Two years later, Kears Group rebranded itself as Rathbones.  

Kears was bought from Greencore by Finedon Mill of Northampton, for £20.6 million in April 2004, a year in which it had sales of £100 million, with customers including Morrisons and Tesco.  Following a fire the company went into receivership, with part of its operation sold to Warburtons and parts to Morrisons in 2005.

References

Bakeries of the United Kingdom
Food and drink companies established in 1893
Food and drink companies disestablished in 2005
Companies based in Gloucestershire
1893 establishments in England
2005 disestablishments in England
British companies disestablished in 2005
British companies established in 1893